El Coyote (the Coyote or prairie wolf) is the name of a fictional character very similar to Zorro (El Zorro), the Fox, although acting several years later (when California had transformed to be a part of the United States' "Wild West"). He first appeared in a Spanish Novelas del Oeste ("Stories of the West") Number 9 pulp novel in 1943, written by Carter Mulford, later as J. Mallorquí. Mulford was one of several pseudonyms of the successful Spanish author José Mallorquí y Figuerola (1913–1972). The novel was issued by the Spanish publishing house Editorial Molino. Mallorquí now started writing a series of extremely popular novels, with the character "El Coyote" in the head role, for Ediciones Cliper. Between September 1944 and late 1953 the hero appeared in a series of 192 pulp-like EL COYOTE novels, with several revival editions throughout the years. They covered 30 years of chronological adventures from 1851 (and earlier) until around 1876, or possibly later (the original Cliper novels were not published in strict chronological order). Cover illustrators were not always identical to inside illustrators. The novels (a Cliper edition already in 1947) – and the comics – were also glued in nice collections and sold in hardbound "limited bookform" (Forum had one with all its novels, and also one with the comics).

The Spanish Editions
 Cliper (1944–1953) – the original editions (which also featured the very first novel, El Coyote) – 192 novels (originally 2.50 pesetas each – later 3 and 4), covers and insides illustrated by Francisco Batet (Pellejero). The first 120  "El Coyote"  started with La vuelta del Coyote ("The return of El Coyote"), in September 1944. There also were 10 Numero Extra (often 6 pesetas – see below – including one Extra-Especial) – and finally 62 (4 and later 5 pesetas) "Nuevo Coyote" were published. 
 Cid (1961–1964) with reeditions of above in one series  (18,4x10,8 cm) illustrated by Jano  (Francisco Fernández Zarza-Pérez) and possibly others.
 Bruguera (1968–1971) with 110 of the early novels (including nine Extras, but not the Especial) – with El proscrito de las lomas as the last (17,5x10,5 cm) illustrated by Antonio Bernal (Romero).
 Favencia (1973–1977) with the 192 novels (18x11 cm) illustrated by Jano, Carlos Prunés, Pedro Alferes Gonzales and others.
 Forum (1983–1984) with 96 reedited double volumes (19x14 cm) – covers illustrated by Salvador Fabá; insides by Julio Bosch and José María Bellalta.
 Planeta DeAgostini (2003–2004)  with the above 96 (21x15 cm) illustrated by Tony Fejzula & R.M. Gera.

The hero and the novels
California was incorporated into the US in 1848 as a result of the Mexican–American War 1846–1848 (after some turbulent years as part of Mexico and even twice as a short-lived independent republic), and registered as the 31st State of the United States in 1850.

El Coyote's identity

César de Echagüe (the III – with Mexican and Spanish roots) was a wealthy, elegant Californio nobleman, resident at the large 40,000 hectare (100,000 acres or 400 km2) ranch, Rancho San Antonio, just north-east of Los Angeles. He had an affable, charming appearance – lazy, comfortable, cynical and sceptic, and with false superficiality. He was educated and refined, a master of expression, and a practical, pragmatic man. Behind his facade he doubled as El Coyote, a masked vigilante hero and defender of the weak – fighting for freedom, honesty and justice. Coyote protected the original Hispanics (and the native Indians) of California from the Anglo Americans, and certainly from all "bad ones". Mallorquí did address the Afro-American question only briefly.

The stories continued the mythical traditions of Robin Hood, Dick Turpin, and The Scarlet Pimpernel – published in 1905, which was the very first popular novel with the "double identity" plot. Dime novel detective Nick Carter debuted in 1886. Tarzan was introduced in 1912, and Zorro found its way to the public in 1919, but El Coyote became even bigger – in Spain. Among other early famous, often masked American novel and/or radio heroes, were The Shadow, debuting 1930 (and 1931), plus The Phantom Detective, Doc Savage, The Spider and Lone Ranger in 1933, and Green Hornet in 1936. Some of the very early comic strip superheroes (or costumed crime-fighters) were Buck Rogers introduced in 1928, Dick Tracy 1931, and Flash Gordon in 1934. The most famous comic book (or strip) hero is Superman originated in 1933 (and commercially published in 1938). In 1934 Mandrake debuted, and the Phantom comic strip (The Phantom) in 1936. Batman and the original Captain Marvel entered in 1939. Captain America and the originals of The Flash, Green Lantern and Daredevil made their debuts in 1940. Wonder Woman, Blackhawk and Green Arrow debuted in 1941, and in 1947 Black Canary entered the scene.

Coyote's appearance
Coyote wore a black (mostly illustrated as dark blue, also in the comics – and sometimes brown) Mexican, decorated charro costume.  He had high black boots (mostly outside the trousers) and a decorated sombrero, a black shirt – neither blue nor red – although most drawings show a white shirt (on the Scandinavian covers blue), with a black (sometimes shown as red or blue) silk scarf or a red tie. He also had a broad black silk belt (sometimes illustrated as a red silk one – although mostly as an American brown belt), plus two holstered revolvers hanging low on a "double" ammunition belt. Some illustrations show only one revolver with ammunition belt and holster – others two revolvers on one holster. He also had a knife – and a rifle, a lasso and a Mexican sarape on his horse – and he wore gloves. The mask covered more of his upper face than shown on most of the fine drawings by Francisco Batet (and especially by several others). The Scandinavian covers presented a relatively large mask (illustrated by Harald Damsleth). In at least one of the early pulps Mallorquí wrote he wore "Mexican peasant clothes" (black – shown brown on some of the very early illustrations by Batet). The Spanish (and Aztec) word "coyote" was also used describing a racial category. El Coyote had two "marks" – one was shooting at an ear lobe of his villains, one was a drawing of a wolf's head on messages.

The original Spanish novels
The novel series mostly comprised the years from December 1851 (and with Cliper number 6 from early 1865) to around 1875. Published in Spain, they originally consisted of 120 volumes 1944–1951 – the last titled Alias el Coyote in March 1951. The novels were not always strictly chronological. One example was the 1851/1853 (extended, 6 pesetas) story El diablo, Murrieta y el Coyote (where César and Guadalupe in 1972 take us back to fascinating events happening in the two years of Coyote "quasi-retirement", with César marrying Leonor and César's father still alive), Cliper novel number 100 and its sequel. In these novels Joaquin Murrieta, who was a "real life" Sonora, Mexico – and later California – famous bandit, is presented in the Mallorqui way. The California Rangers killed him in 1853 in Fresno County, but in the novels here he marries César's cousin Maria Elena (and is not killed). The original novel number 115, El hogar de los valientes, and its sequel, takes us back to around 1855, before Jr. was born. There was also the very late La gloria de don Goyo (which told a story of April 1865 – late civil war era soon after César's "second arrival" in Los Angeles, where the Bella Union and Fort Moore were two frequently featured establishments in the novels). A late original Cliper novel, the six-year-celebration novel La casa de los Valdez and its sequel, told a story César picked up in Spain in 1857 about César I (his grandfather arriving in California in 1767 – the story begins and ends in 1872 at home at the San Antonio ranch). Simultaneously published were 10 Numero Extra (1945–1946), including a reedited version of the original 1943 pulp El Coyote (issued as Edicion Cliper Extra #0 in 1945) and the Especial of 1946 noted below (no numbering at all). The Extras told stories of pre-1851, early  (and also late) 1850s and mid/late 1860s. Later came 62 "reformed" Nuevo Coyote (still on Cliper 1951–1953) – the first published in mid 1951 (Vuelve el Coyote) and telling later, new stories – some intervening in the old chronology (some relating to 1872) – and with a pocket size, turning from 19,7x14,7 cm and 64 pages to 15,5x10,7 cm and 128 pages. The last Nuevo Coyote was titled Los asesinos llegan a Monterrey, aka El Coyote Los asesinos van a Monterrey.

International publishing
The early "Coyote" novels were published in 16 countries in nine different languages. Italy published all 192, often with the same covers as Cliper and with the later ones (with non-Cliper covers) illustrated by Emilio Uberti (and especially Sergio Tarquinio inside). Germany published 84 novels, mostly with Batet's original Cliper illustrations – including reeditions (with different publishers) and new illustrators. Finland had 78 volumes, mostly with Batet illustrations. The original editions in Norway, Denmark and Sweden (with no illustration inside) often had identical covers (special unique ones made for these three countries 18x12 cm). The illustrations on the Scandinavian editions, by Harald Damsleth, are by many ranked as the finest. Only one of the Cliper cover illustrations was "recycled" in Scandinavia – the original Cliper cover of Huracán sobre Monterrey was "covered" by Damsleth in the Swedish (and Norwegian) versions of Plomo en una estrella, which actually was a circa 1874 story, featuring the father and his grown-up son in San Lorenzo Valley (fictional Farish City), not fitting chronologically with the other later Swedish novels. Brazil, often Batet and Bernal covers (but also several others), published all novels in different editions, except for the high-ranked (extended, 6 pesetas) Extra-Especial on the elder Don César de Echagüe.

The ten Numero Extra
 El Coyote (Extra N° 0) – the reedition of the Carter Mulford 1943 pulp – in most of the new editions the original/first story – but on Cliper published in circa mid 1945,  probably directly after #12 (now with Mallorquí as official writer), covering César's arrival in Los Angeles in December 1851, synopsis
 La justicia del Coyote (Extra N° 1, published in 1945) – a story in San Francisco of the mid 1860s, when the railway between East and West was established (First transcontinental railroad). Coyote works with Captain Farrell, synopsis
 La primera aventura del Coyote (Extra N° 2, the last two issued after the original novel #9) – César in around 1869/70, remembering Coyote's debut 23 years earlier, synopsis
 La mano del Coyote (issued after the original novel #11) – a late 1860s story featuring Ricardo Yesares and Teodomiro Mateos,  synopsis
 El precio del Coyote (issued after the original novel #12) – a story in San Francisco around the mid/late 1860s, featuring Guadalupe and Matias Alberes,  synopsis
 Vieja California (published around mid 1946) – an extended story of turbulent California in 1846 and 20 years later, based on actual historic events with César in the head role, synopsis
 El jinete enmascarado (published in September 1946) – a story of goldfinding in 1850, where José Martínez – alias El Coyote – alias César de Echagüe actually meets Edmond Greene before Greene was engaged to Beatriz, synopsis
 Trueno negro (published in late 1946, the last three after the original novel #35) – a story of the secret "Coyote" of 1859 before César's second official arrival in L.A., synopsis
 Una sombra en Capistrano (Extra N° 8, published in December 1946 – issued directly after original novel #38) – Coyote of 1869 looks back on another story of 1859, featuring Fray Jacinto,  synopsis
 and Extra-Especial Don César de Echagüe (published in May 1946, soon after the original novel #31) – about César's father and his death – featuring Leonor, Guadalupe, Julian, Adelia and los Lugones, where the story jumps from around 1870 back to the early 1850s, soon after César's first marriage, and then to "real time" again, synopsis

Although the Extras, numbered 0–8, and the Extra-Especial (no number at all – 6 pesetas) on Ediciones Cliper – all issued during the very first years (1945–46) – did not have any of the other first 120 novels' issue numbers, they have later "entered" the 192 numbering – just like the "Nuevo Coyote" series (which was originally numbered 1–62 on Cliper).

Main plot and characters
César was born in Los Angeles (originally called "el Pueblo de Nuestra Señora la Reina de los Ángeles"), which he left around late 1843 for Mexico and later Havana (Cuba) to study and "become a man". He "officially" returned in December 1851, described in the very first novel, El Coyote, although operating as El Coyote in California several times before that, secretly leaving Mexico during his years abroad.

César de Echagüe alias "El Coyote"
In Mallorquí's first novel, El Coyote, one can trace that César must have been born around 1827 (the novel says he was 25 by his arrival in Los Angeles in late 1851, probably via el Rio Porciuncúla. One can read about Coyote's debut in La primera aventura del Coyote. an early Extra novel, where César was inspired by a masked female actress and by the Zorro legend when he started operating as El Coyote. Coyote later told his son, "El Cuervo", in the stories on César Jr's adventures of late 1872 (when Jr was around 17 years old), that "El Coyote" debuted even younger than his son, long before aged 20.

Coyote's original family
Coyote's father, who had experienced the turbulent years of Spanish and Mexican California, was Don César de Echagüe (II), who found out Coyote's true identity just prior to his death soon after César's first marriage. César's sister Beatriz (aka Beatrice) was born in 1833 – she married Washington resident, political employee and member of the U.S. government, Edmond Greene (aka Edmonds or Edmons, nicknamed Edmondo), who spoke fluent Spanish. Edmond found out Coyote's true identity in late 1851 – and Beatriz probably a bit later. They settled in Washington in 1853 (although later often visiting California). César's first wife Leonor de Acevedo (aka Leonora/Leonore) was born around 1830 (on yet another big ranch near San Antonio – and was betrothed to César already as a child). She became aware of Coyote's double identity by the end of the very first written novel. They married in 1852 during an almost two years period of Coyote retirement. She died around 1856/57, when César Jr was born. Jr called himself El Cuervo (no mask), the Raven, from around late 1872 – although he later abandoned it. César (Coyote) left Los Angeles again directly after his wife's death (even travelling to Europe and Spain) for several years (handing over the child-care to maiden Guadalupe Martinez).

Coyote's second wife
César was abroad again (Europe this time) during 1857-early 1865. Long before his official return in the spring of 1865 César secretly worked as Coyote, and outside California as unmasked José Martinez, after only a few years abroad – one adventure was specifically dated 1859, La sombra del Coyote (with a preface of 1849). At least for a while during the civil war (1861–65) César secretly worked as a neutral Union (northern) Commander at a San Carlos, San Diego fortress under the alias of "Delharty" (shortly before his second return to L.A. in early 1865 – encouraged by Edmond Greene to return home), working to keep California out of the war, helping both northerners and southerners in El Capataz del Ocaso and its sequels (where César looks back from the mid 1870s to the last year of the war). César Jr was reported eight years of age in 1865. Guadalupe was nicknamed Lupe/Lupita (aka Guadelupe). She was the daughter of Julian (aka Julián) Martinez, Coyote's very first close allied (from 1851) and chief servant (and foreman) at César's father Don César's ranch. Julian died just prior to Guadalupe's marriage. Lupe was born in 1835 and married César around late 1870 – in El Diablo en Los Angeles. She and Julian had known of César's double identity from very early on – Julian was told by Coyote (probably even before 1851 – and Lupe found out by "accidental coincidence" in 1853 – La vuelta del "Coyote"). César's and Lupe's child Leonorin was born in 1871 – and fosterchild Eduardito (Gómez de la Mata) that same year (in Rapto). Guadalupe later became de Torres (Julian's real name) and suddenly – in early/mid 1872 (El código del Coyote and its sequels) – was even much richer than César, inheriting a huge ranch (Rancho del Todo) in Coahuila in north Mexico, where she had to spend several months each year with her daughter (the formal heiress) to claim her rights. Around 1874 she gave birth to a son (Apostando su vida, original novel N° 87).

Coyote's allies
Coyote had some interesting early allies (friends). Among the first (besides Julian) were the Lugones brothers – los Lugones – Juan, Timoteo, Evilio, and Leocadio (originally four, but Leo died early) and the old Indian woman Adelia (aka Adela). They helped Coyote from the very first beginning through all the years, and did not know about Coyote's real identity. Two other characters, though, knew – Ricardo Yesares and Matias Alberes. Yesares (from Paso Robles in San Luis Obispo), Coyote's sub/double throughout the years from 1865 (who Coyote had saved from "unfair" hanging that year) debuted in El otro "Coyote", ediciones Cliper number 6 – the first adventure of Coyote's "second arrival". Ricardo was born around 1839/40, and married Serena Morales in Los Angeles in 1866, where he had become the owner of Posada (hotel) del Rey Don Carlos III (Coyote's new and  "secret headquarters"). Coyote's closest allied from 1865 was César's servant (and "bodyguard"), the dumb Indian Matias Alberes (who even sometimes acted as a third Coyote, and was a Coyote allied at least up to around 1874 – he even was featured with Pedro Bienvenido in Los apuros de don César and later novels).  Gunman Mario Lujan (who initially was an enemy of Coyote in Al servicio del Coyote) helped him several times in later novels (and ended up as foreman at the San Antonio ranch). César Jr (the heir of the Acevedo farm) had two good friends in Joao da Silveira and César de Guzmán. He met them in around late 1872 (El Cuervo en la pradera). The skilled Indian Pedro Bienvenido (who was some kind of mind-reader) became an important allied of Coyote and his son César de Echagüe y Acevedo soon after (debuting in La reina del valle and its earlier and later sequels, also featuring Analupe de Monreal).

Other early Coyote characters
Several of the novels' characters appeared throughout the series. Among them, Fray Jacinto at the mission station San Juan de Capistrano, who knew of Coyote's identity (and tried to get César to marry Lupe – he was the only one knowing Julian's true background). He was murdered in late 1872. Later there was Fray Anselmo at San Benito de Palermo. Don Goyo Paz fought in the Mexican–American War and was a ranch owner not too far from San Antonio – los Lugones were hired bodyguards at Don Goyo's, whose son Gregorio Paz was to marry Guadalupe, but "El Diablo" forced César to marry her instead. There were solicitor José Covarrubias, doctor Garcia Oviedo, and Los Angeles sheriff Teodomiro Mateos – sheriff twice (1860s and 1870s), and in later years one of César's best friends. Former civil war spy Ginevra St. Clair appeared in 1869 (El exterminio de la Calavera, where César fell in love with her, but she died). There also were three more adventurers who appeared in several novels – Chris Wardell, "El Diablo" (Juan Nepomuceno Mariñas), and "Princess Irina" (Odile Garson – she debuted in Otra lucha in early 1870, and soon tried to charm César, but ended up as the partner of "El Diablo" after César's marriage). All three started out as some kind of enemies of Coyote.  Anita was Guadalupe's maiden, and San Francisco chief vigilante Captain Farrell became a good friend of Coyote. Another noble ranch owner was Don Rómulo Hidalgo (with his son Justo – his father was murdered around 1871). In the novels there were of course also a lot of villains –  Coyote's worst and toughest enemy probably was Robert Toombs (featured in Guadalupe and its sequels around 1872). Several novels were adventures in sequels (one special long one was Coyote's adventures with Analupe De Monreal around 1873).

Films
 El Coyote, 1955 Spain & Mexico starring Mexican Abel Salazar (shot 1954)
 La justicia del Coyote (The Coyote's justice), 1956 Spain & Mexico with Abel Salazar (also shot 1954)
 El vengador de California – in Italy aka Il segno del Coyote, in Brazil and Portugal as A Marca do Coyote, (also on DVD), 1963 Italy & Spain starring Mexican actor Fernando Casanova
 La vuelta del Coyote (The return of El Coyote), 1998 Spain starring José Coronado, (shot in 1997). aka La vuelta de El Coyote (often listed as a Portugal film), and aka El Coyote – La Pelicula (the movie)

Comics and radio
El Coyote had a comic series adaptation in Spain, Cliper comics, – 113 in the first series by Jose Mallorquí and Francisco Batet, with lots of adventures from 1947 up into 1953, and 2a Epoca in 1954–1955 – with a late revival 1983 on Comics Forum, and even later Batet's originals on Agualarga hard-bound. There was also a long-running Spanish radio series on SER with many episodes, featuring Vicente Mullor. Cliper also published four calendars (1946 and three more years), and 490 Coyote picture cards in 1946.

References and notes

External links
The links below are divided into three sections.

Complete audio files
 Las Aventuras del Coyote – Full Audio files of all 192 novels at ivoox.com channels by kitsume, with short text intro for each novel and the audio files divided in short episodes – the first novel starting with a short annotation by Antonio Martin (Forum editions) – click on Descargar (choose channel ... and learn some Spanish – and possibly some Catalan)

El Coyote fan sites
 "Web de El Coyote" novelascoyote.com (Spanish Coyote Site, created by Miguel Muñoz) – with much information on Los Angeles, examples of the early novels (including Cid), twitter feeds and links to his blog site
 "La Nueva Web El Coyote" www.novelascoyote.blogspot.se (Spanish Coyote Site, created by Miguel Muñoz) – with the first 130 novels in chrono order – not with their original issue numbers (107 with synopsis, and the total 192 listed) plus much information, including images of Spanish covers of all editions from 1944 to 2004 (a total of 686 novel covers), except for Cid
 El Coyote Catalog www.fantascienza.net (Italian Coyote Site) – including Ediciones Cid – and the novels from the whole world, imaged in order of the Italian pulp series
 Coyote Bibliography dreamers.com – with Cliper in publ. order
 Swedish Coyote Site serielagret.se – with images of all Swedish Coyote novels and the complete Cliper catalog (in order of original publishing)
 Swedish Coyote Blog coyote-bloggen.se – with synopsis of the first 125 pulps in Swedish (same chronological numbering as the Spanish Coyote Site)
 Archive Novels List of Finland's 78 novels at Makedonia & Moog (with covers of them all, but also some other countries' equivalents)

Other sites
 El Coyote Western 1955 (featuring Abel Salazar) – on youtube
 La Justicia del Coyote Western movie 1956 – on youtube
 Short presentation and El Coyote portrayed (in 1998 by José Coronado) very close to how Mallorquí originally "pictured" him (although he operated in California – not Baja, Mexico as the site says) 
 Coyote Collection shown live Collection of El Coyote novels shown at biblioteca del Museo Etnográfico in Madrid
 El Coyote Cabalga de Nuevo "Coyote Rides Again" at elcoyotecabalga.blogspot (with images of back covers of the Favencia novels – and more)
 Mallorquí presented chronological at sugarhoover (treasures)
 Coyote on Facebook: El Coyote, de José Mallorquí and EL COYOTE
 Forum and DeAgostini Coyote pulps to buy
 Many Coyote novels for sale with covers and inside illustrations imaged and one more list

Characters in pulp fiction
Fictional characters from California
Fictional gentleman thieves
Fictional vigilantes
Literary characters introduced in 1944
Series of books
Western (genre) gunfighters
Western (genre) outlaws